Suther is a surname. Notable people with the surname include:

 John Suther (1907–1984), American college football player
 Thomas Suther (1814–1883), Scottish bishop

See also
 Suthers